Sunnyside is an unincorporated community in Placer County, California. It lies at an elevation of 6260 feet (1908 m).

Sunnyside is combined with Tahoe City for census purposes into Sunnyside-Tahoe City, California census-designated place (CDP).

References

Unincorporated communities in California
Unincorporated communities in Placer County, California